J. H. Jones may refer to:
 J. H. Jones (Washington politician)
 J. H. Jones (Mississippi politician)